Joshua "Josh" Turnbull (born 12 March 1988) is a Welsh international rugby union player, who currently plays in the Back row and Second row for  Cardiff Rugby in the Pro14 league having previously played for the Scarlets, Llanelli RFC and Llandovery RFC. Born in Haverfordwest, Turnbull is a fluent Welsh speaker.

Club career 
Turnbull made his Scarlets debut in 2007, in a pre season friendly against Exeter Chiefs.

In June 2014 Turnbull joined Cardiff from the Scarlets. He made 130 appearances for the Scarlets over a seven year period.

Ahead of the 2021–22 United Rugby Championship season, Turnbull was named as captain, taking over from Ellis Jenkins.

In 2020, Turnbull started coaching at Carmarthen Quins RFC, initially as forwards coach, but moving to defence coach in 2022.

International career 
Turnbull has represented Wales at U18, U19, and U20 levels; winning the Grand Slam with Wales U19 in 2006. Turnbull has participated in two 2006 & 2007 IRB U19 World Championships. He was in the Wales U20 squad for the 2008 Under-20 Six Nations and Junior World Championship.

In January 2011 Turnbull was named the Wales national rugby union team for the 2011 Six Nations Championship and made his international debut 12 February 2011 in the 24–6 win against Scotland as a second-half replacement. He was named in the preliminary squad for the 2011 Rugby World Cup but was left out of the final squad.

Turnbull made his first start for Wales on 2 June 2012, in a capped friendly against the Barbarians. He featured intermittently for Wales for the next few seasons, playing in both tests against South Africa on the 2014 Wales rugby union tour of South Africa, including a start in the second test.

Turnbull was selected in the squad for the 2016 Six Nations, but did not earn any further caps during the tournament. He came off the bench in the friendly against England, ahead of the 2016 Wales rugby union tour of New Zealand, and was named in the tour squad, but was not selected in any further matchday squads.

It wasn't until the 2018 Wales rugby union tour to Argentina and the United States that Turnbull featured for Wales again, earning a call up after former Scarlets teammate Aaron Shingler was ruled out due to injury. Turnbull came off the bench in both tests, as Wales won the series 2–0.

On the back of an impressive season for Cardiff, Turnbull again earned a recall for the 2021 July rugby union tests, coming off the bench against Canada and Argentina, before starting in the final test against Argentina in his familiar role of blindside flanker.

Personal life
Turnbull was married on 23 July 2016 and has two daughters.

References

External links
Cardiff Rugby profile
Scarlets profile (archived 28-1-10)
Wales profile

1988 births
Living people
Llanelli RFC players
Rugby union flankers
Rugby union players from Haverfordwest
Scarlets players
Wales international rugby union players
Welsh rugby union players
Cardiff Rugby players
Rugby union locks
Rugby union number eights